The 2006 Qatar Open, known as the 2006 Qatar ExxonMobil Open, for sponsorship reasons, was an ATP Tour men's tennis tournament held in Doha, Qatar from 2 January until 7 January 2006. First-seeded Roger Federer won his second consecutive singles title at the event.

Finals

Singles

 Roger Federer defeated  Gaël Monfils, 6–3, 7–6(7–5)
 It was Federer's 1st singles title of the year and the 34th of his career.

Doubles

 Jonas Björkman /  Max Mirnyi defeated  Christophe Rochus /  Olivier Rochus, 2–6, 6–3, [10–8]

References

External links 
 Qatar Tennis Federation official site
 ATP tournament profile

 
Qatar Open
2006 in Qatari sport
Qatar Open (tennis)